Credera Rubbiano is a comune (municipality) in the Province of Cremona in the Italian region Lombardy, located about  southeast of Milan and about  northwest of Cremona.  It was created in 1928 through the merger of the former communes of Credera and Rubbiano.

Credera Rubbiano borders the following municipalities: Capergnanica, Casaletto Ceredano, Cavenago d'Adda, Moscazzano, Ripalta Cremasca, Turano Lodigiano.

References

Cities and towns in Lombardy